David Bruce Leslie Weinberg (born March 2, 1952) is an American former rower. He competed in the men's eight event at the 1976 Summer Olympics. He graduated from Harvard University.

References

External links
 

1952 births
Living people
American male rowers
Olympic rowers of the United States
Rowers at the 1976 Summer Olympics
Rowers from Boston
Harvard Crimson rowers
World Rowing Championships medalists for the United States